Siobhian Brown (born 20 October 1972) is a Scottish politician serving as the Member of the Scottish Parliament (MSP) for Ayr since 2021. A member of the Scottish National Party (SNP), she was a councillor for the Ayr West ward of South Ayrshire Council.

Born in Scotland and raised in Australia, she was elected to the Scottish Parliament in the May 2021 election. Brown has served as Convener of the COVID-19 Recovery Committee since June 2021.

Political career 
Brown joined the Scottish National Party the day after the 2014 Scottish independence referendum. She was elected to South Ayrshire Council for the Ayr West ward in the 2017 Scottish local elections.

Scottish Parliament 
In November 2020, she was selected as the SNP's candidate for the Ayr constituency in the 2021 Scottish Parliament election. In May 2021, she was elected as a member of the Scottish Parliament for Ayr with a majority of 170 votes, defeating the incumbent John Scott who had been the Scottish Conservatives' longest serving MSP.

Personal life 
Born in London to Scottish parents, Brown emigrated to Sydney, Australia when she was three years old. After travelling around the world working in Spain, Italy, London and Scotland, she moved to Ayrshire—where her parents are from—in 1999. Brown has four children (including a step-daughter), with her youngest being born when she was 44 years old. In 2016 she founded the South Ayrshire Babybank and remains a volunteer for the organisation.

References

External links 
 

Year of birth uncertain
Living people
Scottish National Party MSPs
Members of the Scottish Parliament 2021–2026
Scottish National Party councillors
Female members of the Scottish Parliament
People associated with South Ayrshire
Councillors in Ayrshire
Scottish emigrants to Australia
Women councillors in Scotland
1972 births